Douglas McClelland  (born 5 August 1926) is an Australian former politician who served as a Senator for New South Wales from 1962 to 1987, representing the Australian Labor Party (ALP). He was Minister for the Media (1972–1975) and Special Minister of State (1975) in the Whitlam Government, and ended his political career as President of the Senate (1983–1987). He resigned from the Senate to become High Commissioner to the United Kingdom (1987–1991). McClelland is the earliest surviving Senator - and along with Bill Hayden and Manfred Cross, is the earliest elected Labor MP still alive.

Early life
Born on 5 August 1926 in the western Sydney suburb of Wentworthville, Doug McClelland was the son of Gertrude Amy (née Cooksley) and Alfred McClelland. His father was a farmer, union organiser, and ALP politician who served two terms in the Parliament of New South Wales (1920–1927 and 1930–1932). He attended Wentworthville Public School before going on to Parramatta High School and the Metropolitan Business College in Parramatta. After leaving school he found work as a clerk in the state Agriculture Department.

In 1944, five days after his 18th birthday, McClelland enlisted in the Australian Imperial Force (AIF). He was stationed for periods in New South Wales, Queensland, and the Northern Territory before being discharged in January 1947 with the rank of corporal. From 1949 he worked as a court reporter, employed by the state and federal governments. During this time he was an active member of the Australian Journalists Association.

Politics
McClelland joined the ALP in 1947 and was elected to the state executive in 1956. He served as the campaign secretary for his father's close friend H. V. Evatt, who was the member for Barton and served as federal leader of the ALP from 1951 to 1960. Evatt transferred to a different electorate in 1958, and McClelland lost the Barton preselection ballot to Len Reynolds by just two votes. He was elected to the Senate at the 1961 federal election, aged 35, to a term starting on 1 July 1962.

McClelland was Minister for the Media from 19 December 1972 to 6 June 1975, Manager of Government Business in the Senate from 9 July 1974, and then Special Minister of State. He also served as President of the Senate from 21 April 1983 until his resignation on 23 January 1987. (He was no relation to fellow ALP cabinet minister Jim McClelland.) From 1981 until his resignation he was the Father of the Senate.

In August 1981, McClelland was elected Chairman of Committees in the Senate, adding the title Deputy President in October. He defeated National Country Party senator Douglas Scott by one vote with the aid of the Democrats, marking the start of the convention that the position is held by the opposition. When the ALP won the 1983 federal election, McClelland was elected President of the Senate in place of Harold Young.  In 1985 and 1986, he was represented by lawyers at the trials of Lionel Murphy, a judge of the High Court and former ALP senator, where concerns had arisen over whether parliamentarian witnesses could be examined on their conduct in parliament. McClelland subsequently introduced what became the Parliamentary Privileges Act 1987, which defined and codified certain aspects of parliamentary privilege. It was "the first bill introduced by a presiding officer in the history of the Australian Parliament".

McClelland retired from the Senate in January 1987, the year before the opening of the new Parliament House. He had served as chairman of the Joint Standing Committee on the New Parliament House from 1983.

Later life
McClelland served as Australian High Commissioner to the United Kingdom from 1987 to 1991.

Personal life
McClelland married Lorna McNeill and they have one son—Robert McClelland, the former member for Barton—and two daughters.  He was made a Companion of the Order of Australia in June 1987.

McClelland was awarded the Douglas Wilkie Medal for services to non-football in 1973 by the Anti-Football League. The accolade was presented after McClelland introduced a points system for television programming.

References

External links

 

 

1926 births
Australian Labor Party members of the Parliament of Australia
Presidents of the Australian Senate
Members of the Australian Senate
Members of the Australian Senate for New South Wales
Members of the Cabinet of Australia
1975 Australian constitutional crisis
Companions of the Order of Australia
Douglas Wilkie Medal winners
Living people
High Commissioners of Australia to the United Kingdom
Permanent Representatives of Australia to the International Maritime Organization
20th-century Australian politicians
Court reporters
Australian Army personnel of World War II
Australian Army soldiers